Ari Wallach (born 1974) is an American futurist.

Wallach is the founder and Executive Director of Longpath, an initiative fostering long-term thinking and behavior in the individual, organizational, and societal realms. Longpath focuses on giving individuals a greater sense of agency over their futures and helping society at-large to tackle its “wicked problems”. Wallach is the author of Longpath: Becoming the Great Ancestors Our Future Needs - An Antidote to Short-Termism by Harper Collins. 

Previous to Longpath, Wallach founded Synthesis Corp., a strategy and innovation consultancy that counted the United Nations High Commissioner for Refugees (UNRefugees), Pew Research Center, Ford Foundation, CNN, NRDC and the US State Department amongst its clients.

Early life and education
Wallach was born in Guadalajara, Mexico where his father, a Polish Holocaust survivor and member of the Jewish underground in World War II, established a successful industrial infrastructure business after an 11-year stint in Cuba pre and post-revolution. Eventually, the family moved to the San Francisco Bay Area where Wallach was raised.
Wallach's mother is a Bay Area artist who most recently was included in a Marc Chagall retrospective. Regarding the passing of Ari's father in 1993, Sen. Harry Reid declared “Recently our Nation lost a national treasure… His family's loss was ours. There is one fewer just man to stand and tell the truth. One fewer just man to bear witness. We who are living must remember him and what by living he taught us. We must, we shall, never forget.”

Wallach majored in Peace and Conflict Studies at UC Berkeley.

Career
Wallach's career has ranged from work in media, government, and various creative fields. Wallach worked with the Democratic National Committee, Clinton/Gore 96, and the US Institute of Peace, all in Washington, DC.

Wallach is the founding director of INFORUM—one of the nation's largest non-partisan public affairs forums for young people. Following Coro Wallach became the Founder of re:think media, a cross-platform producer of public affairs content and also served as Vice President of Seed Media Group from 2006-2008.

In 2008, Wallach founded The Great Schlep — the viral GOTV campaign that mobilized young Jewish voters for Obama in 2008. The Great Schlep received over 342 million global media impressions and activated over 25,000 volunteers.

Wallach founded Synthesis Corp. in 2008 in order to assist governments, NGOs, foundations, and corporations at the C-suite level to discover new ways to drive sustainable innovation, rethink business models and improve top-line metrics.

Synthesis is working with the United Nations High Commissioner for Refugees to develop UNHCR labs—whose mission will be to drive innovation both inside and outside of UNHCR to further their collective ability to serve persons of concern worldwide with the latest tools, platforms and processes.

Wallach sits on the boards of 70 Faces Media, blankonblank.org, and the Coalition on the Environment and Jewish Life. Ari is also on the advisory board to the CITRIS Data and Democracy Initiative based at UC Berkeley.

Wallach is an adjunct associate professor at Columbia University lecturing on innovation and the future of governance and public policy.

In November 2015, Fast Company magazine launched Fast Company Futures with Ari Wallach, an initiative to bring together people from business, technology, policy, and culture sectors.

Personal life
Wallach is married to Sharon Wallach. They have two daughters and a son who, as The New York Times noted, are only allowed to read printed books.

References

Living people
1974 births
Futurologists